Eta Delphini, Latinized from η Delphini, is a candidate astrometric binary star system in the northern constellation of Delphinus. It has an apparent magnitude of about 5.4, meaning that it is faintly visible to the naked eye. Based upon a parallax measurement of 13.81 mas made by the Hipparcos spacecraft, this star is around 240 light years away from the Sun. It is advancing in general direction of the Earth with a radial velocity of −25 km/s.

The stellar classification of the visible component is A3 IVs, which matches an A-type subgiant star with narrow absorption lines. SIMBAD lists this star as a variable star, although it is not catalogued as such in the GCVS. It has more than double the mass and radius of the Sun, and is radiating 35 times the Sun's luminosity from its photosphere at an effective temperature of around 9,355 K.

References

A-type subgiants
Astrometric binaries
Delphini, Eta
Delphinus (constellation)
BD+12 4378
Delphini, 03
195943
101483
7858